47A Besant Nagar Varai is a 2006 Tamil-language drama film directed by Goutham Krishna. The film stars Abbas, Sangeetha and Ravali, while Janagaraj and Thalaivasal Vijay also appear in supporting roles. Having begun production in 1997, the film was released after a production delay to a mixed response in 2006.

Cast
Abbas as Ramakrishnan
Sangeetha
Ravali
Janagaraj
Thalaivasal Vijay
K. R. Vatsala
Indhu
C. R. Saraswathi
Gundu Jayalakshmi
Rajasekhar

Production
The film began production under the title of Mansakkul Varalaama in 1997, with Goutham Krishna casting Abbas, Sangeetha and Ravali. The title had initially been associated with another film directed by Vasanth starring Ajith Kumar, but after that project became shelved, Goutham Krishna took the title. However, the film suffered production troubles and the venture was shelved. In 2005, the makers revived the project under the title of 47A Besant Nagar Varai because of numerological reasons, and prepared the film for release.

Soundtrack
The film's soundtrack, composed by Deva, was released in March 1998 with the song "Anarkali" garnering critical acclaim.
"Rasiga Enakku" - Mano, Swarnalatha
"Anarkali" - SPB
"Hello Congratulations" - Mano
"Aadamum" - Deva
"Chinna Poo" - Sujatha Mohan

Release
The film had a low profile release in 2006.

References

2006 films
2000s Tamil-language films
2006 romantic drama films
Indian romantic drama films
Films scored by Deva (composer)